"2120 South Michigan Avenue" is an original instrumental by the Rolling Stones, recorded for their second EP Five by Five. It was also released on their second US album 12 X 5 in 1964. Composer credit goes to Nanker Phelge, a title giving credit equally to all members of the band. In the book Rolling with the Stones, Bill Wyman recalls that the composition process started with him playing a bass riff and that the others followed on jamming.

The title refers to the address of the offices and recording studios of Chess Records and Checker Records in Chicago, where the five songs for the EP were recorded in June 1964.

AllMusic reviewer Richie Unterberger described the track as "a great groovin' original blues-rock jam". The song was originally released at just over two minutes in length, fading early for lack of time available on a conventional EP in 1964. A full-length (3:38 minute) version appears on the 1964 West German Decca LP Around And Around, and the 2002 CD re-release of 12 X 5. There is also a rarer second take which has a rougher, more blues-based sound than the better known Five by Five rock-groove version. This version, with its short but distinctive tremolo guitar riff, was under consideration as the title track of an eventually unreleased 1964 blues album.

In 1965, Sly Stone released a single, "Buttermilk", that copied the "2120 South Michigan Avenue" riff and overall sound. In 2011, George Thorogood and the Destroyers released an album called 2120 South Michigan Ave., which includes a cover of this song as well as covers of other Chess Records artists.

The song "Space Rock Pt. 2" which came out in 1967 by the Cleveland, Ohio band, The Baskerville Hounds, was based on this track, although composition is credited solely to D.J. Kohler.

Personnel
 Bill Wymanbass guitar
 Brian Jonesharmonica 
 Charlie Wattsdrums
 Keith Richardsguitar
 Ian Stewartorgan
 Mick Jaggertambourine

References

The Rolling Stones songs
1964 songs
Songs written by Jagger–Richards
Rock instrumentals
1960s instrumentals